The Bagnolese is a breed of sheep from the area surrounding Bagnoli Irpino in the province of Avellino, in Campania in southern Italy. It takes its name from that of the town. It is raised principally in Irpinia, in the Monti Picentini, in the Monti Alburni, in the Piana del Sele and in the Vallo di Diano. It probably derives from the Barbaresca breed, and may also have been influenced by the Comisana. It is one of the forty-two autochthonous local sheep breeds of limited distribution for which a herdbook is kept by the Associazione Nazionale della Pastorizia, the Italian national association of sheep-breeders.

In 2013 total numbers for the breed were 13538.

References

Sheep breeds originating in Italy
Ark of Taste foods